The MV Karadeniz Powership İrem Sultan is a Liberia-flagged Powership, a floating power plant, owned and operated by Karpowership. Built in 1984 by the Fincantieri Marghera Shipyard in Venice, Italy and christened MV Nikolay Markin, she sailed as a barge carrier under various names and flags until in 2014 she was converted into a powership at the Sedef Shipyard in Tuzla, Istanbul, Turkey. She served in Nacala, Mozambique supplying electricity to Mozambique's power grid for land-locked Zambia. Currently, she serves in the dominican Republic and is stationed in Santo Domingo.

Barge carrier

She was built by the Fincantieri Marghera Shipyard in Venice, Italy with yard number 305 as a barge carrier (LASH carrier) in April 1984.

She saw service under the names Nikolay Markin, Danube Express, Smit Enterprise and Enterprise before she was sold in August 2010 to Karpowership.

Powership
The originally barge carrier was converted into a Powership at the Sedef Shipyard in Tuzla, Istanbul as the fifth of the fleet. The construction cost 110 million. She was renamed Karadeniz Powership İrem Sultan. The vessel is registered under the Liberian flag with homeport Monrovia.

She has a generation capacity of 114 MW on dual-fuel (HFO- and gas-fired). In October 2011, the Powership sailed to Basra, Iraq, where she supplied electricity for about one million residents there in a timespan of three years.

In November 2015, Karpowership was awarded to supply electricity to land-locked Zambia via cross-border interconnected transmission lines through Mozambique and Zimbabwe. Powership started delivering electricity in March 2016, within less than 4 months from contract signing. The contract is to initially supply 100 MW of base load power.

In March 2018, upon the completion of the contract with Zambia, Karpowership signed a new contract with Mozambique’s electricity utility company, Electricdade de Mozambique (EdM) to supply 48 MW of base load for 5 years.

A similar ship will be built for Adelaide. 

In November 2022 she is stationed in the dominican Republic in front of Santo Domingo.

Ship's registry
 ex-MV Nikolay Markin owned by Ukrainian Danube Shipping Co. based in Izmail, Ukraine registered in the Ukrainian SSR with homeport Izmail until June 14, 1992,
 ex-MV Danube Express owned by Ukrainian Danube Shipping Co. based in Izmail, Ukraine registered in Malta  with homeport Valletta until July 1998,
 ex-MV Smit Enterprise owned by Smit Transport & Heavy Lift B.V. based in Rotterdam, Netherlands registered in the Bahamas with homeport Nassau until July 2003,
 ex-MV Enterprise owned by Dockwise Shipping based in Breda, Netherlands registered in the Netherlands Antilles with homeport Willemstad until August 2010.

References

External links 

1984 ships
Ships built in Venice
Ships built by Fincantieri
Merchant ships
Ships of Ukraine
Merchant ships of the Netherlands
Ships of Liberia
Irem Sultan
Electric power infrastructure in Iraq
Ships built at Sedef Shipyard